A slipstream is a pocket of reduced pressure following behind an object moving through a fluid medium.

Slipstream may also refer to:

Computing
 Slipstream (computer science), the technique of running a shortened program concurrently and ahead of the execution of the full program
 Slipstream (computing), a slang term for merging patches or updates into the original installation sources of a program
 Slipstream 5000, a 1995 racing game for PC

Fiction
 Slipstream (genre), a literary genre that pushes the boundary between traditional fiction and either science fiction and/or fantasy
 Slipstream (radio drama), a BBC Radio 7 science fiction series
 Slipstream (science fiction), fictional methods of faster-than-light travel

Characters
 Slipstream (comics), a Marvel Comics superhero character
 Slipstream (Transformers), several robot characters in the Transformers franchise including Transformers: Animated
 Slip Stream (G.I. Joe), a pilot character in the G.I. Joe franchise

Film
 Slipstream (unfinished film), an unfinished Steven Spielberg movie
 Slipstream (1973 film), a Canadian drama directed by David Acomba
 Slipstream (video), a 1980 concert by Jethro Tull
 Slipstream (1989 film), a post-apocalyptic adventure directed by Steven Lisberger
 Slipstream (2005 film), a time travel thriller directed by David van Eyssen
 Slipstream (2007 film), a drama written and directed by Anthony Hopkins

Music
 Slipstream (band), a UK indie band

Albums
 Slipstream (Bonnie Raitt album), 2012
 Slipstream (Sherbet album) or the title song (see below), 1974
 Slipstream (Sutherland Brothers and Quiver album) or the title song, 1976

Songs
 "Slipstream" (song), by Sherbet, 1974
 "Slipstream", by Killing Joke from Extremities, Dirt and Various Repressed Emotions, 1990
 "Slipstream", by Jethro Tull from Aqualung, 1971
 "Slipstream", by Mike Oldfield from Light + Shade, 2005
 "Slipstream", by Threshold from Dead Reckoning, 2007

Others
 Slipstream (arcade game), a 1995 racing game by Capcom
 Slipstream (magazine), a literary press and magazine founded in 1980
 Slipstream (sculpture), a sculpture created by Richard Wilson
 Drafting (aerodynamics), also called slipstreaming
 Team Slipstream, a UCI professional cycling team